Surya is a 2004 Bengali action film directed by Haranath Chakraborty. The film features actors Prosenjit Chatterjee and Anu Chowdhury in the lead roles. The film was a remake of the 2002 Telugu film Aadi.

Cast 
 Prosenjit Chatterjee as Surjo Narayan Chowdhury
 Anu Chowdhury as Reena, Surjo's love interest
 Arunima Ghosh as Pooja Halder, Mahim Halder's daughter
 Ranjit Mallick as Avinash, Head of Pancha Pandav, Surjo's adopted father
 Ashok Bhattacharya as Ashok Narayan Chowdhury, Surjo's biological father
 Dulal Lahiri as 2nd member of Pancha Pandav
 Rajesh Sharma as 3rd member of Pancha Pandav
 Arun Banerjee as Village headmaster
 Subhasish Mukherjee as Shambhu, Reena's brother and son of village headmaster
 Dipankar De as Mahim Halder
 Kanchan Mallick as College student
 Debesh Raychowdhury as 4th member of Pancha Pandav
 Anamika Saha as Mahim Halder's wife
 Mrinal Mukherjee as 5th member of Pancha Pandav
 Nilabhra Sett as Surjo (child role)
 Premjit Mukherjee as Ratan Halder, Mahim Halder's son
 Diganta Bagchi as Monty
 Mrityun Hazra as Satya, Mahim Halder's henchman

Soundtrack 

The album is composed by Babul Bose while lyrics are penned by Goutam Susmit. The background score is composed by S. P. Venkatesh.
Kumar Sanu, Shaan, Udit Narayan, Sadhana Sargam, Shreya Ghoshal, Sneha Panth has given their voices for the album.

References

External links
 

Bengali-language Indian films
2004 films
Bengali remakes of Telugu films
Films about feuds
Indian action drama films
2004 action drama films
Indian films about revenge
2000s Bengali-language films
Films scored by Babul Bose
Films directed by Haranath Chakraborty